Mount Faloria is a mountain in the Alps of northern Italy, located in the Dolomites near Cortina d'Ampezzo. It hosted the men's giant slalom event of the 1956 Winter Olympics, won by Toni Sailer of Austria, the first of three wins in his gold medal sweep. There is a mountain refuge at the summit, Rifugio Faloria.

Features

A cable car, which runs from Cortina through thickly wooded territory and grass land, reaches a station at the mountain. The site is also approached by a four-seat chairlift from the Rio Gere on the  Pian de ra Bigontina-Costa Faloria line. From the terrace of the bar at Faloria station, there are views of the mountain and other peaks to the north.

A bar and restaurant existed on top of the mountain as early as 1939, and in 1941, plans for Rifugio Edda Ciano Mussolini were approved. It was built on the initiative of the Funivie Aeree Italiane Turistiche (FAIT) di Cortina d’Ampezzo. The building is situated close to the upper station of the cable car. After World War II, the structure was renamed Rifugio Faloria.

Trekkers can take easy trails along the slopes from the Mount to reach the valley. However, treks to Lake Sorapis need some effort. The lake, which is set in the midst of vertical rock cliffs, has white sand on its shores and the lake water is emerald in colour.

Michelangelo Antonioni directed a documentary film in 1950 titled La Funivia Del Faloria (The Funicular of Mount Faloria) on the cable car between Mount and the Cortina d'Ampezzo, which has a run time of 10 minutes.

References

Bibliography

External links

 Faloria at Dolomiti.org

Venues of the 1956 Winter Olympics
Olympic alpine skiing venues
Sports venues in Italy
Dolomites
Mountains of the Alps
Mountains of Veneto
Geography of Cortina d'Ampezzo